Mimi Morales (born April 11, 1976 in Cartagena, Colombia) is a Colombian actress.

During her childhood she became interested in Martial Arts, and she has practiced ballet since she was 4 years old.

She first starred in a TV ad for a Colombian soda. Later, she was spotted by a Novela producer who offered Mimi a role in: Amor a mil.

She studied Social Communication at the Politécnico Gran Colombiano in Bogotá.

Filmography

Film

Television

External links 
 

1976 births
Living people
Colombian film actresses
Colombian television actresses
21st-century Colombian actresses
People from Cartagena, Colombia